Jang Sung-min (born 5 September 1963) is a South Korean politician. He was formerly the president of the Grand National Unity Party.

Biography 
Jang was born in Goheung County, South Jeolla Province. He started his political career under former president Kim Dae-jung. He was elected to the National Assembly as a member of the Millennium Democratic Party in 2000 but lost in 2002 due to his violation of election law.

In 2012, he became one of the hosts of the television show Jang Sung-min's Current Affairs Tank.

Controversy 
While he was working at Jang Sung-min's Current Affairs Tank, he was involved in controversies about reporting that the Gwangju Uprising was supported by North Korea. Although he denied it, the controversy was taken seriously.

He declared that he would run for the upcoming presidential election as a member of People's Party. He registered to enter for the party, however, the party rejected his bid. Because of that, he was forced to create a new party with the name of Grand National Unity Party.

After GNUP was dissolved, in March 2018, he entered to Bareunmirae Party.

References 

1963 births
Living people
South Korean politicians
Indong Jang clan
Sogang University alumni